Ville Tikkanen (born 8 August 1999) is a Finnish professional footballer who plays for SJK, as a defender.

References

1999 births
Living people
Finnish footballers
Sportspeople from Oulu
Seinäjoen Jalkapallokerho players
SJK Akatemia players
Veikkausliiga players
Ykkönen players
Kakkonen players
Association football defenders